Oceania Rugby Women’s Championship is an international women's rugby union competition contested by women's national teams from Oceania. The current Champions is Fiji who claimed their third Oceania title at the Championship in New Zealand.

History
The Oceania Rugby Women's Championship was introduced in 2016, and since its inception, also serves as a Rugby World Cup qualification tournament.

Before the establishment of the Championship there were few international fixtures for women's rugby in the region which hindered its progress. Matches were restricted to occasional test matches as part of the Rugby World Cup qualification process. It was established to provide more regular and consistent international competitions for the region.

The first tournament was held in 2016 in Suva, the match was between Fiji and Papua New Guinea as a part of the Rugby World Cup 2017 qualification. The Fijiana's won and moved onto a Repechage tournament against Hong Kong and Japan.

2018 saw Samoa and Tonga join Fiji and Papua New Guinea in Lautoka. Fiji were the eventual victors.

In 2019, six teams contested the title, with development squads from Australia and New Zealand joining their Pacific neighbours in Lautoka. The Black Ferns Development XV won the 2019 Oceania Championship in Lautoka, Fiji.

The 2020 Championship was cancelled due to the COVID-19 pandemic.

In 2022, Fiji won the Oceania Championship to clinch their third title.

Champions

See also
Women's Pacific Tri-Nations
Women's international rugby

References

Women's rugby union competitions in Oceania for national teams